Rocca al Mare (Italian for "Rock-by-the-Sea") is a subdistrict in the district of Haabersti, Tallinn, the capital of Estonia. It is mostly covered by the Estonian Open Air Museum. Besides the museum there is also a private secondary school Rocca al Mare School located in the subdistrict.

Estonia's third largest shopping centre, Rocca al Mare Shopping Centre is located southeast of Rocca al Mare, officially located in the Haabersti subdistrict.

There are no residents living in the subdistrict.

Gallery

References

External links

Estonian Open Air Museum
Rocca al Mare School

Subdistricts of Tallinn